Catherine Lefebvre (born 1 May 1959) is a French curler.

She participated in the demonstration curling event at the 1988 Winter Olympics, where the French women's team finished in eighth place.

Teams

References

External links

Living people
1959 births
Sportspeople from Haute-Savoie
French female curlers

Curlers at the 1988 Winter Olympics
Olympic curlers of France